Gayennoides is a genus of South American anyphaenid sac spiders first described by M. J. Ramírez in 2003.  it contains only two species, both found in Chile.

References

Anyphaenidae
Araneomorphae genera
Spiders of South America
Endemic fauna of Chile